The 1966 Central Michigan Chippewas football team represented Central Michigan University in the Interstate Intercollegiate Athletic Conference (IIAC) during the 1966 NCAA College Division football season.  In their 16th and final season under head coach Kenneth Kelly, the Chippewas compiled a 5–5 record (3–0 against IIAC opponents), lost five straight games to start the season, won five straight to end the season, won the IIAC championship, and outscored all opponents by a combined total of 213 to 159.

The team's statistical leaders included quarterback Bob Miles with 5,000 passing yards, Bob Rosso with 662 rushing yards, and Wally Hempton with 574 receiving yards.  Miles also threw a school record 17 interceptions in 1966. Offensive guard Paul Verska received the team's most valuable player award.  End Greg Hoefler set a school record (since broken) with 187 receiving yards against Wayne State on November 19, 1966.  Ten Central Michigan players (Miles, Rosso, Hoefler, Veska, defensive guard Chuck Barker, halfbacks Bob Foldesi and Don Krueger, defensive end Mark Maksimovicz, tackle Mike Pintek, and defensive tackle Bill Sinkule) received first-team honors on the All-IIAC team.

Coach Kelly retired as Central Michigan's head football coach at the end of the 1966 season after 16 years in the position.  He compiled a 91–58–2 record as the head football coach at Central Michigan.

Schedule

References

Central Michigan
Central Michigan Chippewas football seasons
Interstate Intercollegiate Athletic Conference football champion seasons
Central Michigan Chippewas football